Helen Lewis may refer to:

 Helen Morris Lewis (1852–1933), American suffragist 
 Helen Lewis (chemist) (1896–?), American chemist
 Helen Lewis (film editor) (1898–?), Canadian film editor
 Helen Block Lewis (1913–1987), American psychiatrist and psychoanalyst
 Helen Lewis (choreographer) (1916–2009), dance teacher and choreographer
 Helen Matthews Lewis (1924–2022), American sociologist, historian, and activist
 Helen Lewis (journalist) (born 1983), English journalist